Bermuda competed in the Summer Olympic Games for the first time at the 1936 Summer Olympics in Berlin, Germany.
After gaining IOC recognition in February 1936, Bermuda were invited to take part in the 1936 Summer Olympics. With the financial backing of Sir Howard Trott, a team of swimmers would be sent. Whitfield Fredrick "Chummy" Hayward a successful businessman and an accomplished athlete, arranged for American coach William Brooks to come to Bermuda to train the swimmers and also persuaded Leonard Spence an ex-world breaststroke record holder to move from British Guiana to Bermuda in order to compete for them. He traveled to Berlin as the team manager, and carried the flag at the opening ceremony.

Swimming

References

Official Olympic Reports

Nations at the 1936 Summer Olympics
1936 Summer Olympics
1936 in Bermuda